Sindora glabra is a tree of the family Fabaceae (or Leguminosae) endemic to the People's Republic of China that grows in the provinces of Hainan, Fujian, Guangdong and Yunnan. The species is under second-class national protection in China.

Habitat and description

Sindora glabra produces good quality wood used for building houses and making furniture.

References

External links
 Missouri Botanical Garden - w3TROPICOS  Nomenclatural Data Base

glabra
Trees of China
Endemic flora of China